So Fresh: The Hits of Winter 2002 is an Australian compilation album of pop songs. It was released on 17 June 2002 by Sony BMG.

Track listing
 Shakira – "Whenever, Wherever" (3:18)
 The Calling – "Wherever You Will Go" (3:29)
 Ronan Keating – "If Tomorrow Never Comes" (3:37)
 Enrique Iglesias – "Hero" (4:12)
 Ja Rule featuring Ashanti – "Always on Time" (4:05)
 Busta Rhymes – "Break Ya Neck" (4:06)
 Selwyn – "Way Love's Supposed to Be" (3:52)
 Westlife – "World of Our Own" (3:31)
 Anastacia – "One Day in Your Life" (3:30)
 Jamiroquai – "Love Foolosophy" (3:48)
 Kosheen – "Catch" (3:23)
 Toya – "I Do!!" (3:37)
 Alicia Keys – "A Woman's Worth" (4:23)
 Five for Fighting – "Superman (It's Not Easy)" (3:42)
 U2 – "Walk On" (4:31)
 Grinspoon – "Chemical Heart" (4:40)
 1200 Techniques – "Karma" (4:21)
 H-Blockx featuring Turbo B – "The Power" (3:29)
 Natalie Imbruglia – "Wrong Impression" (3:25)
 Pink – "Get the Party Started" (3:13)

Charts

References

So Fresh albums
2002 compilation albums
2002 in Australian music